Rayjan Rajan is an Indian actor who appears  in Malayalam-language television shows. He is best known for playing SATHYAJITH IPS in Athmasakhi.

Career
He began his career as a model and worked in short films such as Makkachi and Black Hole. In 2012, he played the lead role in the TV series Makal and later pursued a career in engineering. After a hiatus, he returned to Mollywood small screen with Athmasakhi which made him a household name among the Malayali audience. In between he starred in a few shorts films like Blackhole, 3 Guns and Balaji. He also played the lead pair with Mamta Mohandas in the film Johny Johny Yes Appa. He also won the title of TOI Most desirable man on Television 2018 He has also done several modelling assignments. He has also appeared in Popular TV shows like Comedy Circus, Thakarppan Comedy, Star Magic and Aram + Aram = Kinnaram as a participant.

Filmography

Television

Films

References

Male actors in Malayalam television
Living people
Male actors in Malayalam cinema
Indian male film actors
People from Thrissur
Male actors from Kerala
People from Guruvayur
Male actors from Thrissur
Year of birth missing (living people)